Virbia endophaea is a moth in the family Erebidae. It was described by Paul Dognin in 1910. It is found in Bolivia.

References

Natural History Museum Lepidoptera generic names catalog

Moths described in 1910
endophaea